Norde may refer to:

 Norde (Gilsa), a river of Hesse, Germany, tributary of the Gilsa
 Nordê, a village in the Tibet Autonomous Region of China
 Nordé, a village in northern-central Burkina Faso
 Sony Norde (b. 1989), Haitian footballer